Medellin in Colombia was the eighth leg and second to last of the 2013-14 South American Beach Volleyball Circuit. The tournament was held May 30 – June 1, 2014.

32 teams participated in the event (16 per sex).

Women's competition

Participating teams

 ARG1 Virginia Zonta – Julieta Puntin
 ARG2 Camila Hiruela – Irene Verasio
 BRA Fernanda Berti – Elize Maia
 CHI Camila Pazdirek – Francesca Rivas
 ECU Mishelle Molina – Ariana Becerra
 COL1 Erica Grisales – Cindy Garcia
 COL2 Andrea Galindo – Jeimy Luna
 COL3 Cristina Escobar – Rosa Beltran
 COL4 Johana Mora – Katerine Valderrama
 COL5 Sadat Rios – Wendy Rojas
 COL6 Marly Ardila – Laura Salazar
 PAR Michelle Valiente – Erika Mongelos
 PER Andrea Sandoval – Cinthia Herrera
 URU Lucia Guigou – Fabiana Gómez
 VEN1 Olaya Pazos – Yetsi Lezama
 VEN2 Milagros Hernández – Frankelina Rodríguez

Pools

Pool A

|}

|}

Pool B

|}

|}

Pool C

|}

|}

Pool D

|}

|}

Men's competition

Participating teams

 ARG1 Ian Mehamed – Facundo del Coto
 ARG2 Leandro Aveiro – Aulisi Santiago
 BOL Israel Martínez – Sergio Franco
 BRA1 Evandro Gonçalves – Victor Gonçalves
 BRA2 Harley Silva – Joallyson Gomez
 CHI Esteban Grimalt – Marco Grimalt
 COL1 Julián Carmona – Juan Camilo Gil
 COL2 Jorge Cabrera – Juan David Paternina
 COL4 Omar Zapata – Andrés Ramírez
 COL3 Johan Murray – Jorge Manjarres
 COL5 Gustavo Piedrahita – Álex Racero
 COL6 Henry Castro – Gdeivi Paez
 COL7 Carlos Vásquez – Jhon Castro
 URU Michael González – Marco Cairus
 VEN1 Vicente Salazar – Gerardo Méndez
 VEN2 Ronald Fayola – Carlos Rangel

Pools

References

2014 in beach volleyball
South American Beach Volleyball Circuit 2013-14